The Noon of the 10th Day is a 1988 documentary film by Mahmoud Shoolizadeh about people mourning in Ashoora in the city of Khansar in Isfahan province, Iran. In this ceremony, which takes place every year in the tenth day of Moharram by Shiite Muslims, the customs of the public mourning for the loss of their religious leader is shown. In this film, poetic and dramatic scenes from the Battle of Karbala is reconstructed.

This film participated in the Short Film Festival in Esfahan, Iran, in 1991.

Technical specifications and film crew
Betacam sp, 25 min. Documentary, Iran, 1988
Script writer and Director: Mahmoud Shoolizadeh,
Photographer: Mohammad Dodangeh
Edit: Ali Tahvil Dari
Producer: Javad Peyhani (I.R.I.B., Isfahan)

See also
 List of Islamic films

1988 films
1980s Persian-language films
Documentary films about Islam
Iranian documentary films
1988 documentary films